Quan Sơn is a district (huyện) of Thanh Hóa province in the North Central Coast region of Vietnam.

As of 2019 the district had a population of 45,520. The district covers an area of 943 km². The district capital lies at Quan Sơn.

References

Districts of Thanh Hóa province